Dark Lady is a novel by Richard North Patterson published in 1999.

Reception
Entertainment Weekly qualified it as a legal thriller-cum-murder mystery, and criticized its characterizations, pacing, and lack of suspense.
The Wall Street Journal praised the suspense.

References

External links
 Official website

1999 American novels
Legal thriller novels